Drashti Khemka Dhami (born 10 January 1985) is an Indian actress, model and dancer who works predominantly in hindi television. She is one of the most popular Hindi television actresses having worked in several successful shows into her belt like Dill Mill Gayye, Geet, Madhubala, Ek Tha Raja Ek Thi Rani, Pardes Mein Hai Mera Dil and Silsila Badalte Rishton Ka all of which she received critical acclaim. In 2013, dhami participated in Jhalak Dikhhla Jaa 6 with choreographer Salman Yusuff Khan and emerged as the winner. 

She has also ventured into web series with The Empire portraying Khanzada Begum in (2021) and ZEE5 crime thriller Duranga portraying Ira Jaykar in (2022).

Early life and family 

Dhami was born on 10 January 1985 into a Gujarati family in Mumbai, where she studied. She attended Mary Immaculate Girl's High School and also went to Mumbai's Mithibai College from where she has a degree in sociology. Before entering into modelling, Dhami was a dance instructor Dhami belongs to a conservative family. According to her interview in The Times of India, she said:

On 21 February 2015, Dhami married businessman Neeraj Khemka in a traditional Hindu ceremony. Suhasi Dhami, also an actress, is married to her elder brother Jaisheel Dhami. Dhami said that her in-laws are very supportive when it comes to her work.

Career

2007–2011: Career beginning and debut show

Dhami started her career in modelling for print and television advertisements before debuting in the entertainment industry with her appearance in the music video "Saiyyan Dil Mein Aana Re" followed by "Humko Aaj Kal Hai", "Teri Meri Nazar Ki Dori" and "Nachle Soniyo Tu" and worked in advertisements like Colgate, Lion Honey, Pulimoottil Silks, Vasan Eyecare, RKS Grand, Amul, VIP Bags, Chevrolet and Reliance.

Dhami made her acting debut in television with Star One's poular show Dill Mill Gayye, where she portrayed Dr. Muskaan Chadda from 2007 to 2009. In 2008, she participated in the reality show, Kaun Jeetega Bollywood Ka Ticket by Ekta Kapoor. In 2010, she appeared as the female lead in Star One's Geet – Hui Sabse Parayi opposite Gurmeet Choudhary. Dhami got recognition with her portrayal of the character Geet with this role. The show ended in December 2011 after the channel got closed.Dhami made an appearance on Imagine TV's reality show Big Money: Chota Parda Bada Game in 2010. The same year, she was also a part of another reality show, Nachle Ve with Saroj Khan.

2012–present: Madhubala and Jhalak Dikhhla Jaa 6

In May 2012, Dhami made a guest appearance on the show Na Bole Tum Na Maine Kuch Kaha. Later, she played the lead role in Colors TV's show Madhubala – Ek Ishq Ek Junoon opposite to Vivian Dsena from 2012 to 2014. In 2013, Dhami participated in Colors TV's popular dance reality show, Jhalak Dikhhla Jaa 6 and emerged as the winner alongside her choreographer Salman Yusuff Khan. In June 2014, Dhami hosted Jhalak Dikhhla Jaa 7. However, she later got replaced by Manish Paul. In December 2014, Dhami participated in Sony TV's Box Cricket League playing in the team Mumbai Wariors.

In 2015, Dhami played the role of Rani Gayatri in Zee TV's Ek Tha Raja Ek Thi Rani opposite Siddhant Karnick. While playing the role of Gayatri, Dhami said:

 She quit the show in May 2016. The same year, she joined the web series I Don't Watch TV along with Karan Patel, Nakuul Mehta, Karan Wahi, Disha Parmar, Sanaya Irani, Kritika Kamra and many other TV celebrities.

In November 2016, Dhami joined Star Plus's Pardes Mein Hai Mera Dil as Naina Batra, opposite Arjun Bijlani. The show went off air in June 2017.

From June to October 2018, she played Nandini, a victim of domestic violence who falls in love with her best friend's husband in Colors TV's Silsila Badalte Rishton Ka, opposite Shakti Arora. A critic from India Today praised her, saying that she is equally good as another television actress Sriti Jha who also played a victim of domestic violence in the past. She quit the show in November 2018.

Other appearances
In 2011, Dhami did special dance performances on shows like Chhoti Bahu - Sawar Ke Rang Rachi, Sajan Re Jhoot Mat Bolo and Pyaar Kii Ye Ek Kahaani. In 2012, she made a guest appearance on Colors TV's Na Bole Tum Na Maine Kuch Kaha to promote her show Madhubala.

In March 2013, she made a guest appearance on Nach Baliye 5 to support her brother Jaisheel Dhami  and sister-in-law Suhasi Dhami. In June 2014, Dhami was seen on Colors TV's Mission Sapne and later made another appearance on Comedy Nights with Kapil. In September 2015, she was seen as a guest on Jhalak Dikhhla Jaa 8 to support Sanaya Irani.

 Other work 
Dhami was the brand ambassador for Canvironment Week 2011 and 2013 to support the cause of 'Save Our Planet'. In 2016, she was part of the Swachh Survekshan 2017 Initiative for an environmentally cleaner India (Swachh Bharat Abhiyan).

Dhami was also the captain for Team 'D' Celebrity Championship 2016, where six teams comprising 78 television personalities competed to help kids in need of education and food. She won, and received an award from 'I HELP A KID.COM' Celebrity Championship.

In 2017, Dhami became the brand ambassador of Bajaj Brahmi Amla Ayurvedic Hair oil.

Films and advertisements

In the mediaBombay Times called her 'Numero Uno' actress on television. Dhami is also known for her style and fashion sense. Dhami is among the highest earning television actresses in India. In 2011, she was voted the most desirable woman on television in polls conducted by TellyChakkar.com. She is the brand ambassador of MATRIX India's hair colour brand, SoColor.

Dhami was included in second place on "Television's Top 10 Actresses" list by Rediff. Dhami also included in the top nine list of Indian television most stylish on-screen actress by Rediff. The UK-based newspaper Eastern Eye placed her in their "50 Sexiest Asian Women" list. In 2012, Eastern Eye placed her at twelfth position. Thereafter she remained in the top three spots for three consecutive years, listed at the third spot in 2013, the second spot in 2014, the third spot in 2015, the fourth spot in 2016, sixth spot in 2017, and twelfth spot in 2018. Dhami included in list of FHM India 100 Sexiest women of 2014 at tenth place. In 2016, Dhami was nominated in "Sexiest Woman" list by FHM India.

Dhami was listed eight among the "35 Hottest Actresses in Indian Television" by MensXP.com, an Indian lifestyle website for men. She was ranked in 38th position in The Times of India's 2014 list of "50 Most Desirable Women". According to the survey in India in 2017, Dhami was voted as desirable woman opposite to Hrithik Roshan in the list.

Dhami received an offer to participate in Bigg Boss but she rejected it. During her dance performance on Jhalak Dikhhla Jaa 6, film maker Karan Johar compared Dhami to film actress Zeenat Aman. Filmmaker Karan Johar complimented Dhami by saying that she is better than Kareena Kapoor when she performed in the song "Halkat Jawani" from the film Heroine on Jhalak Dikhhla Jaa 6. She is also known as Madhubala from her serial Madhubala – Ek Ishq Ek Junoon'' and as Maaneet due to her chemistry with Gurmeet Choudhary.

Filmography

Television

Special appearances

Web series

Short films

Music videos

Awards and nominations

References

External links

 
 

Living people
1985 births
Actresses from Mumbai
Female models from Mumbai
Indian television actresses
Indian soap opera actresses
Indian web series actresses
Actresses in Hindi television
Gujarati people
Mithibai College alumni
21st-century Indian actresses